Despite the historic usage of wind power to drain water and grind grain, the Netherlands today lags behind all other member states of the European Union in the production of energy from renewable sources. In 2019, the Netherlands produced just 8.6% of its total energy from renewables. According to statistics published by Eurostat, it is the last among the EU countries in the shift away from global warming-inducing energy sources. The leading renewable sources in the country are biomass, wind, solar and both geothermal and aerothermal power (mostly from ground source and air source heat pumps). In 2018 decisions were taken to replace natural gas as the main energy source in the Netherlands with increased electrification being a major part of this process. 

The low take up of renewable energy may be partially explained by the flat and often sub-sea level landscape and subsequent limits to hydropower resources, although hydro poor resource countries such as Denmark have still managed to make renewables the focus of their energy needs. 
In 2015, Dutch wind turbines had a total nameplate capacity of 3,431 MW. As of 2017, a number of large offshore windfarms have either come online (Gemini wind farm) or have been granted authorisation (Borssele 1 and 2, and Borssele 3 and 4 wind farms). The total capacity of these windfarms is 11 GW. Most of the tiny contribution made to electricity generation by hydroelectricity came from three power plants.

A large part of the renewable electricity sold in the Netherlands comes from Norway, a country which generates almost all its electricity from hydropower plants. 
In the Netherlands, household consumers can choose to buy renewable electricity. The relative amount of renewable energy used by household users has been steadily increasing, rising from 38% in 2008 to 69% in 2017.

One area in which the Netherlands is a relative leader is in the adoption of electric plug in vehicles. In 2019 plug-in electric vehicles in the Netherlands represented 15% of car sales, making it the world's second highest share after Norway. Electric vehicles are able to run on renewable electricity with lower emissions and have the potential to provide grid power storage facilities.

Energy consumption by sector 
All EU countries along with Iceland and Norway submitted National Renewable Energy Action Plans (NREAPs) to outline the steps taken, and projected progress by each country between 2010 and 2020 to meet the Renewable Energy Directive targets for each country. Each plan contains a detailed breakdown of each country's current renewable energy usage and plans for future developments. According to projections by the Dutch submission in 2020 the gross final energy consumption in the Netherlands by sector breaks down as follows:

*After adjustments.

Using the unadjusted NREAP data approximately half of energy consumption (52.8%) is used in the heating and cooling sector. The heating and cooling sector (also known as the thermal sector) includes domestic heating and air conditioning, industrial processes such as furnaces and any use of heat generally. The next largest share is the electricity sector at 24.7%, followed by the transport sector at 22.5%. Total annual energy consumption before adjustments for aviation is projected to be 52,088 ktoe (52.million tonnes of oil equivalent) by 2020. In order to meet the Netherlands overall target for 14.5% (or 14% using the slightly different renewable energy directive calculation methodology) use of renewable energy in Gross final energy consumption by 2020 (it was just 2.5% in 2005) targets have been set for each sector. Renewable energy targets for the year 2020 by sector are: 8.7% in the heating and cooling sector, 37% in the electricity sector and 10.3% in the transport sector.

Historical trends

Early development in overall renewable energy 
Total renewable energy use was just 1.1% of overall energy use in 1990. This increased to 7.4% in 2018. The electricity sector first overtook the heating and cooling sector in 2005 in terms of total renewable energy use.

Recent trends in renewable energy 
The Netherlands has a minimum target of 14% of renewable energy use by 2020. The sectoral targets for 2020 break down into national targets of 8.7% in the heating and cooling sector, 37% in the electricity sector and 10.3% in the transport sector although these figures may be slightly different from those implied by the minimum trajectory path. The following table shows the actual results recorded of renewable energy use by sector:
Actual overall renewable energy use grew from 4.3% in 2009 to 5.5% by 2014. The minimum trajectory planned for 2013-2014 was 5.9% and for 2015-2016 7.6% of total energy use. The Netherlands is regarded as amongst the most likely countries to miss 2020 national renewable energy targets as outlined by the Renewable Energy Directive.

Renewable electricity 

In 2022, around 40 percent of the electricity consumed in the Netherlands came from renewable sources. Renewable electricity production was up 20 percent compared to the year before. Production from fossil sources fell by 11 percent. Most of the growth in renewable energy production came from solar.

Biomass has historically been the biggest source of renewable electricity, but wind and solar power have increased rapidly in recent years.

Sources

Wind power 

2016 was a record year for new wind turbine installations totalling 887 MW bringing the totalled installed capacity to 4,328 MW by year end. 691 MW of the new installations were offshore. The Dutch government has a target of 6,000 MW of onshore wind power by 2020 and 4,450 MW of offshore wind power by 2023.

In 2017, the Netherlands had 2294 wind turbines. The wind capacity installed at end 2017 will, in a normal wind year, produced 9% of electricity, when the equivalent value for Germany was 16.1% and Portugal 14%.

In 2022 the Netherlands announced it increased its offshore wind target to 21 GW by 2030. That would meet approximately 75% of the countries electricity needs. With this, offshore wind energy makes an important contribution to achieving the increased climate target of 55% less CO2-emissions.

Solar power 

By 2017 year end cumulative installed capacity of solar PV power reached a preliminary estimate of 2,749 MW with 700 MW added in that year alone. Whilst the Netherlands saw its capacity grow by the fourth highest in Europe during 2017 its installed capacity per inhabitant remained relatively low at 160.9 Watts per inhabitant compared to the European average of 208.3 Watts per inhabitant.

Biomass 
Sources of biomass in the Netherlands include the biogenic fraction of waste that is burned in waste incineration plants. Waste wood is also collected for use in the Netherlands and other EU countries. Manure is used to produce biogas and wood pellets are co-fired in electricity plants. 590 kton of pellets were imported, mostly from the United States of America and around 140 kton from Dutch sources contributing 12 to 13 PJ of primary energy to co-firing in energy plants in 2013–2014. 
Biofuels are produced in the Netherlands for both domestic and export markets.

Rapeseed and maize crops were hardly used in 2014 to produce biofuels in Holland with reasons cited being the high price of corn and resistance to using food crops for fuel production. Rapeseed is used for well over 1% of the imported biofuels (biodiesel) while corn is used for 11% (bioethanol). Germany was the largest supplier of rape seed in 2014 (53%), followed by Romania (13%). For maize the largest supplier in 2014 was Ukraine (39%), followed by France (24%). Some maize fodder is fermented for biofuel production in Holland.

Biomass produced 76,657 TJ of energy for final consumption in 2013. The largest share was destined for the heat sector at 42,886TJ followed by the electricity sector at 21, 649T J and then the transport sector with 12,123TJ.

Hydroelectricity 

Due to its flat landscape the Netherlands has only very limited hydroelectric resources. In 2014 hydroelectricity produced just 112 Gwh of power out of a total electricity production from all sources of 103,418 GWh.

Heat Pumps 
 
−	
An interesting source of heat recovery used in the Netherlands is sourced from freshly milked milk, or warm milk. However at 0.3% of total renewable energy production (2010 figures) this source is not likely to accelerate energy transition in the country. Warm milk is still not mentioned in the EU Renewable Energy Directive, nor in international energy statistics and so is not included is gross final consumption figures. It does however provide Dutch farmers with plenty of hot water.
 
−	
In 2010, 740,000 dairy cows (about half of the country's total) provided 277 TJ of heat energy avoiding 18,000 tons of CO2 emissions.  According to industry sources for every litre of milk cooled, 0.7 litres of warm water is produced. Water pumped through the plate heat exchanger reaches 50 °C to 55 °C. The energy recovered from 1000 litres of milk per day over a year generates heat equal to: 13,100 kWh of electrical energy, 1,900 litres of oil, 1,650 m³ of natural gas or 950 kg of propane gas.

Climate change 
In 2008 Prime Minister Jan Peter Balkenende claimed that the Netherlands annually uses €1–1.5 billion  (0.3% of national income) to protect against the risks of the sea level rise. Many areas are under sea level in the Netherlands and are protected by dam and dikes. In 2010 he Netherlands supported raising the European Union emission restrictions from 20% to 30%; however, the Netherlands has only committed to reaching the minimum 14% goal for itself.

See also

 Wind power in the Netherlands
 Solar power in the Netherlands
 Hydroelectric power in the Netherlands
 Electricity sector in the Netherlands
 Energy in the Netherlands

External links
 European Commission National Renewable Energy Action Plans
 European Commission renewable energy Progress Reports
 European Commission National Energy Efficiency Action Plans

Notes

References